Wikstroemia ovata grows as a shrub or small tree up to  tall. Inflorescences bear up to 20 greenish-yellow flowers. The specific epithet ovata is from the Latin meaning "egg-shaped", referring to the leaves. Habitat is thickets and forests from sea level to  altitude. W. ovata is found in Borneo and the Philippines.

References

ovata
Plants described in 1857
Flora of the Philippines
Flora of Borneo